The Loft Historic District North is a national historic district in Baltimore, Maryland, United States. It includes 12 large 19th–early 20th century vertical brick manufacturing buildings centering on Paca, Redwood, and Eutaw Streets near the University of Maryland Campus in downtown Baltimore. Most of the buildings are still used for manufacturing purposes, although a few, including the Heiser, Rosenfeld, and Strauss buildings, have been converted into loft apartments or offices. They are representative of Romanesque, Victorian, and early modern industrial architectural design. It was in this area that Baltimore's garment industry grew to national importance.

The Loft Historic District North was added to the National Register of Historic Places in 1985.

References

External links
, including photo dated 2004, at Maryland Historical Trust
Boundary Map of the Loft Historic District North, Baltimore City, at Maryland Historical Trust

Historic districts on the National Register of Historic Places in Baltimore
Victorian architecture in Maryland
Romanesque Revival architecture in Maryland